Renata Mauro (born Renata Maraolo; 17 May 1934 – 28 March 2009) was an Italian singer, actress and television presenter for RAI, the Italian state broadcaster.

She became known to international audiences for hosting game show Jeux Sans Frontières 1967 to 1970 and the  when it was held in the Italian city of Naples in 1965.

Filmography

Move and I'll Shoot (1958)
The Naked Maja (1958)
The Wastrel (1961)
The Shortest Day (1963) (uncredited)
 (1963, TV miniseries)
Biblioteca di Studio Uno: La primula rossa (1964, TV)
Biblioteca di Studio Uno: Al Grand Hotel (1964, TV)

See also
List of Eurovision Song Contest presenters

References

External links

1934 births
2009 deaths
Italian television presenters
Italian women television presenters
Mass media people from Milan
Italian film actresses